Balyktykol is a lake in Karkaraly District, Karaganda Region, Kazakhstan, one of many lakes by that name.

The nearest inhabited places are Karabulak  to the southeast, Yegindybulak  to the east by Mount Ku, and Koyandy village  to the NW of the northwestern lakeshore. The lake is an Important Bird Area under threat.

Geography
Balyktykol is a heart-shaped lake in the central/eastern Kazakh Uplands. The lakeshores are low and gently sloping in the northwest and in the east, but in the remaining stretches they are rocky, with steep cliffs. The bottom of the lake is sand and mud.

The water of Balyktykol is fresh but hard. The lake is fed by snow, rainfall and underground water. The Ozdenbay River flows into the lake from the north and the Taldy River flows out of the NW lakeshore heading towards lake Karasor to the west. The highest water level is in April during the spring floods, and the lowest usually in October. The lake freezes in November and thaws in April.

Flora and fauna
There is steppe vegetation around Balyktykol, with wormwood and sedges. In some areas meadows are fringing the banks with fescue, spear grass, Achnatherum splendens and Caragana growing tall. Every year at the lake there is a large concentration of migratory birds. The main fish species in the lake are crucian carp and common bream.

See also 
List of lakes of Kazakhstan

References

External links
Juri rides to Balyktykol Lake
Озера и реки Казахстана (in Russian)

Lakes of Kazakhstan
Karaganda Region
Kazakh Uplands
Important Bird Areas of Kazakhstan